Call Me by My Name is the sixth studio album by British soul singer Ruby Turner, released in October 1998. Turner co-wrote five songs and enlisted the help of rhythm and blues luminaries Bobby Tench, Zoot Money, Stan Webb and Bad Company bassist Boz Burrell.

Track listing
"Call Me by My Name" (Ruby Turner, Andrew G. Williams) 4:38
"Reassure Me" (Bowers) 4:17
"Suspicious Again" (Milton, Ruby Turner) 4:17
"Just Say the Word" (Besencon, Michele Vice) 4:35
"Brand New World" (Ruby Turner, Andrew G. Williams) 5:03
"Breath I Need" (Milton, Turner) 4:44
"You Were Never Mine" (Delbert McClinton, Gary Nicholson, Benmont Tench) 3:52
"My Intuition Tells Me" (Ebanks) 4:54
"Let Me Show You (My Mistakes)" (Duke, McClinton) 4:47
"Alone Here Tonight" (Milton, Ruby Turner) 3:14
"Last on My List (No More)" (Ruby Turner, Andrew G. Williams} 4:14
"Could You Need Me Too" (Ruby Turner, Andrew G. Williams) 3:59
"There for You" (Ruby Turner, Andrew G. Williams) 4:47
"All Shall Be Well" (Ruby Turner, Andrew G. Williams) 4:47

Personnel

Musicians
Ruby Turner – vocals, backing vocals
Boz Burrell – bass
Sam Kelly – drums
Zoot Money – keyboards, backing vocals
Bobby Tench – electric guitar, vocals
Stan Webb – guitar
Andy G. Williams – piano

Production
Zoot Money – producer
Phil Rogers – Design
Harry Shapiro – Liner Notes
Del Taylor – Executive Producer
Adrian Zolotuhin – Engineer

External links

1998 albums
Ruby Turner albums